Lagin may refer to:
 Leinster, Irish province
 Lazar Lagin
 Ned Lagin, an American artist, photographer, scientist, composer, and keyboardist